Indrek Kaseorg (born 16 December 1967 in Tartu) is a retired Estonian decathlete.

Achievements

Personal bests

References

http://www.decathlon2000.com/591/indrek-kaseorg

External links

1967 births
Living people
Estonian decathletes
Athletes (track and field) at the 1996 Summer Olympics
Athletes (track and field) at the 2000 Summer Olympics
Olympic athletes of Estonia
Sportspeople from Tartu
Universiade medalists in athletics (track and field)
World Athletics Championships athletes for Estonia
Universiade silver medalists for Estonia
Medalists at the 1993 Summer Universiade